North Shore School District 112 is a school district in Illinois. Its headquarters are in Highland Park.

Schools
 Middle schools:
 Northwood Junior High School
 Edgewood Middle School
 Elm Place Middle School (closed after 2016-2017 School Year)
 Elementary schools:
Braeside Elementary School
Indian Trail Elementary School
Lincoln Elementary School(closed after 2016-2017 School Year)
Oak Terrace Elementary School
Ravinia Elementary School
Red Oak Elementary School
Sherwood Elementary School
Wayne Thomas Elementary School
 Early Childhood Center at Green Bay School

References

External links

 North Shore School District 112

School districts in Lake County, Illinois
Highland Park, Illinois